Lepence is a settlement on the left bank of the Sava Bohinjka River in the Municipality of Bohinj in the Upper Carniola region of Slovenia.

Name
The name of the settlement was changed from Lepence-Log to Lepence in 1953.

History
The neighboring village of Log v Bohinju was part of Lepence until 1997, when it was made a village in its own right.

References

External links

Lepence at Geopedia

Populated places in the Municipality of Bohinj